Paragraf 224 is a 1979 Czechoslovak film. The film starred Josef Kemr.

References

External links
 

1979 films
Czechoslovak drama films
1970s Czech-language films
Czech drama films
1970s Czech films